The Z class are a class of diesel locomotives built by English Electric Rocklea for the Tasmanian Government Railways in 1973. They were a development of the WAGR RA class and were the last of a line of very successful locomotives fitted with the English Electric 12CSVT Mk II engine.

History
With the construction of a new line from Launceston to Bell Bay, Tasmanian Government Railways placed an order for four 1752 kW locomotives with English Electric. However, with the locomotive still under development, it was decided to purchase four 1380 kW locomotives that were an evolution of the Western Australian RA class locomotives with a low nose profile and vacuum brakes. At 96 tons, they were considerably heavier than the previous heaviest locomotives on the network, the Y class at 58 tons, requiring significant upgrades to infrastructure.

In March 1978 the Z class were included in the transfer of the Tasmanian Government Railways to Australian National. In 1984-1985 all had their vacuum brakes replaced with air brakes.

In June 1998 all were renumbered as the 2110 class. All four locomotives were modified for driver-only operation between 1998 and 2001, by having their noses lowered further and the size of the front cab windows increased.

All remained in service with TasRail until stored in May 2014 with the entry into service of the new TR class, new drivers having ceased training on these locos 8 months prior. 

In 2022, after being awarded a grant, Bellarine Railway was able to purchase two of the class, this being Z1&4. Z1 was delivered in March and Z4 in May. Z3 was also donated and delivered in May to Don River Railway.

Status table

See also 
 Former Tasmanian Government Railways locomotives
 Locomotives of the Tasmanian Government Railways/1950

References

Co-Co locomotives
English Electric locomotives
Diesel locomotives of Tasmania
Railway locomotives introduced in 1973
Diesel-electric locomotives of Australia